Cesare Battisti (born 18 December 1954) is an Italian terrorist, former member of the Armed Proletarians for Communism (PAC), a far-left militant and terrorist group which committed acts of illegality and crimes in Italy in the late 1970s during the period known as the "Years of Lead". He was sentenced to life imprisonment in Italy for four homicides (two policemen, a jeweller and a butcher). He fled Italy first to France and then to Mexico before settling in Brazil where he lived as a free man until an order of extradition issued in December 2018. He then fled to Santa Cruz in Bolivia, where he was arrested in 2019 by an Italian team of Interpol and extradited to Italy where is currently under arrest. He is also a fiction author, having written 15 novels.

Battisti was sentenced to 12 years for being a member of an armed group and for the material killing of two people and instigating another two homicides. He fled to France in 1981, where he received protection under the Mitterrand doctrine. Later, he was tried in absentia based on testimony in Pietro Mutti's trial implicating him in four murders, bringing the total number of charges against him to 36. He was sentenced to life in prison in 1995. After the de facto repeal of the Mitterrand doctrine in 2002, Battisti fled to Brazil under a false identity to avoid a possible extradition.

He was arrested in Rio de Janeiro on 18 March 2007 by Brazilian and French police officers. Later, the Brazilian Minister of Justice Tarso Genro granted him the status of political refugee, in a controversial decision which was much criticized in Italy, even in Brazil and the international press. On 5 February 2009, the European Parliament adopted a resolution in support of Italy and held a minute of silence in memory to Battisti's victims. On 18 November 2009, the Brazilian Supreme Court considered the refugee status illegal and allowed extradition, but also stated that the Brazilian constitution gives the president personal powers to deny the extradition if he chooses to, effectively putting the final decision in the hands of Brazilian President Luiz Inácio Lula da Silva. On 31 December 2010, on Lula's last effective day as president, the decision not to allow extradition was officially announced.

Battisti was released on 9 June 2011 from prison after the Brazilian Constitutional Court denied Italy's request to extradite him. Italy plans to appeal to the International Court of Justice in The Hague. In March 2015 a federal judge ruled null and void the decision to grant him a permanency visa as it would conflict with Brazilian law, ordering his deportation. On 14 September, the sixth section of the Regional Federal Courts of the First Region (seated in Brasília) declared the deportation of Battisti illegal. In December 2018, Brazilian President Michel Temer signed the order to extradite Battisti after the Brazilian Supreme Court ordered his arrest. He fled justice after this and escaped to Bolivia, where he was finally arrested on 12 January 2019. He was extradited to Italy the day after, where he is currently serving a sentence of life imprisonment.

Youth and PAC membership 
Cesare Battisti was born in 1954 at Cisterna di Latina, near Latina. He left the classical lyceum he was attending in 1971, engaged in petty crime, and then moved on to more serious offenses.

In 1976, he moved to Milan, and took part in activities of the PAC, an autonomist Marxist group which conducted armed struggle, and which had a "horizontal", decentralized structure, opposed to the centralist organization of the Red Brigades (BR). The organization, which counted approximately 60 members, had its roots in Barona, a district in the south of Milan.

Four assassinations were committed by the PAC: Antonio Santoro, a prison guard accused by the PAC of mistreatment of prisoners (on 6 June 1978 in Udine); jeweler Pierluigi Torregiani, who had shot and killed a robber in an act of self-defense (on 16 February 1979 in Milan); Lino Sabbadin, a butcher and member of the neo-fascist Italian Social Movement (on the same date, near Mestre); and DIGOS agent Andrea Campagna, who had participated in the first arrests in the Torregiani case (on 19 April 1979 in Milan). The PAC also engaged in several robberies.

The murder of Torregiani and Sabbadin had been decided by the PAC because both of them had killed militants in the past. Torregiani was killed as revenge in front of his 13-year-old son, who was also shot by his father as a result of a tragic error. The son was left paralysed, and the paraplegic Torregiani considers now that, in any case, Battisti is responsible for the shooting, and should serve his sentence in jail: "It's not about the person of Cesare Battisti," he declared to the national press agency ANSA, "It's in order that everyone understands that, sooner or later, those who have committed such serious crimes should pay for their faults."

First trial and escape 
Cesare Battisti was arrested and jailed in Italy on 26 February 1979, sentenced to 12 and a half years in prison for participation in an "armed group" ("partecipazione a banda armata"). He was sentenced on the ground of material evidence and testimony provided by two "collaboratori di giustizia" (defendants who testified against their former accomplice) who benefitted from lighter sentences for their testimony. The status of "collaboratore di giustizia", also popularly known as pentito, was established by anti-terrorist legislation enacted during this period.

PAC members organised his escape on 4 October 1981, while he was in Frosinone prison. Battisti fled to Paris and then Puerto Escondido, Oaxaca, Mexico, very shortly afterward. While in Mexico, he founded a literary review, Via Libre, which is still active. He also participated in the creation of the Book Festival of Managua, Nicaragua, and organised the first Graphic Arts Biennal in Mexico. Battisti began to write at the suggestion of Paco Ignacio Taibo II and collaborated with various newspapers.

Second trial 
Pietro Mutti, one of the leaders of the PAC who had been sentenced in absentia for the assassination of the prison guard Santoro, was arrested in 1982. He sought the status of collaboratore di giustizia and his testimony, which helped him reduce his sentence, implicated Battisti and an accomplice in the four assassinations claimed by the PAC. Battisti's trial was thus reopened in 1987, and he was sentenced in absentia in 1988 for two assassinations (Santoro and DIGOS agent Campagna) and complicity in murder in the two others (jeweler Torregiani and butcher Sabbadin). The court sentenced him in 1995, on appeal, to a life-sentence. Two years earlier, the Court of Cassation had quashed, on procedural grounds, the case against Battisti's accomplice, accused by Pietro Mutti.

Two of the assassinations occurred on 16 February 1979, one at Milan at 15h, and the other in Mestre, 270 km away from Milan, at 16h50. Battisti was sentenced for materially committing the first assassination, and for planning the second one.

Return to France 
In 1985, the Socialist President of France François Mitterrand had indicated that "leftist Italian activists who were not indicted for violent crimes and had given up terrorist activity would not be extradited to Italy"; this became known as the "Mitterrand doctrine". Many Italian political activists had fled to France during the 1970s-1980s. Trusting in this declaration, Battisti returned to France in 1990, where he was arrested at Italy's request in 1991, when his sentence was confirmed in the Court of Cassation. He thus passed five months in Fresnes prison and then was freed after the extradition request was rejected by the Paris Appeal Court on 29 May 1991. French justice concluded that the anti-terrorist legislation enacted in Italy "went against the French principles of law," which, along with the European Court of Human Rights (ECtHR), prohibited in particular extradition of a person sentenced in absentia if that person had not been in a condition to adequately defend himself during his trial. The court also declared the evidence against Battisti as "contradictory" and "worthy of a military justice."

After his release in 1991, Battisti lived in Paris, where he wrote his first novel, Les Habits d'ombre ("The shadow clothes"). Two thrillers, L'Ombre rouge ("The red shadow") and Buena onda ("Good wave"), took as their setting and backdrop the Parisian world of Italian fugitives from justice. Another major novel, titled Dernières cartouches ("Last bullets"), takes place in Italy during the "years of lead".

In 1997, jointly with other left-wing Italians who had fled to France and were accused of taking part in violent crimes, he asked without success the President of Italy at the time, Oscar Luigi Scalfaro (DC), for amnesty.

Diplomatic dispute between France and Italy 
Over the years, Italy asked France several times to arrest and extradite left-wing Italians involved in court cases connected with political violence in Italy who had fled to France. On 11 September 2002, the extradition of Battisti and others was again requested during a meeting in Paris between Italy's Minister of Justice Roberto Castelli and France's Minister of Justice Dominique Perben.

Arrest in France
On 10 February 2004, the French government arrested Battisti at Italy's request and planned to extradite him to Italy. On 30 June 2004, the Paris Court of Appeal approved his extradition. An appeal to the Court of Cassation was filed against this opinion and another to the Conseil d'État against the extradition decree. President Jacques Chirac stated on 2 July 2004 that he would not oppose the French justice system's decision to extradite him. Perben confirmed Paris' new position: "There is no ambiguity. There has been a change of attitude from France, and I support it," (in reference to the "Mitterrand doctrine"), among other reasons "because of the European construction".

As of 2007, only Paolo Persichetti, former member of the Unità Comuniste Combattenti, among the 200 Italians involved in Court cases dealing with political violence requested by Italy, had been extradited (in August 2002). He was eventually sentenced to 22 years in prison. Minister Edouard Balladur signed Persichetti's extradition decree in 1994; it was validated by the Conseil d'Etat the following year. According to RFI radio station, the Perben-Castelli agreement was divided in three parts: all events before 1982 would be prescribed "except in case of exceptional gravity"; facts between 1982 and 1993 would be "examined on a case by case basis", in function of the European Convention of Human Rights (ECHR) principle and of the "conditions in which the trials took place in Italy".

Still claiming innocence, Cesare Battisti failed to check in at the local police station while on parole, and went underground on 21 August 2004.

On 18 March 2005, the French Conseil d'Etat (the French Supreme Court in administrative law), ruling ultimately for Battisti's extradition, affirmed clearly that the Italian legislation did not conflict with the French principles of law. The Conseil established that:

In July 2005, the Italian press revealed the existence of the Department of Anti-terrorism Strategic Studies (DSSA), a "parallel police" created by Gaetano Saya, leader of New Italian Social Movement neofascist party, and Riccardo Sindoca, two leaders of the National Union of the Police Forces (Unpf). Both claimed they were former members of Gladio, NATO's "stay-behind" paramilitary organization involved in Italy's strategy of tension and various alleged activist acts. According to Il Messaggero, quoted by The Independent, judicial sources declared that wiretaps suggested DSSA members had been planning to kidnap Cesare Battisti.

On 5 February 2005, the European Parliament adopted a resolution in which it expressed its trust "that the re-examination of the decision on the extradition of Cesare Battisti will take into account the judgment delivered by an EU Member State in full compliance with the principle of the rule of law in the European Union".

The European Court of Human Rights (ECtHR), in its December 2006 decision, rejected Battisti's claim that France's extradition decision was illegitimate. The Court considered that:

The applicant had patently been informed of the accusation against him and of the progress of the proceedings before the Italian courts, notwithstanding the fact that he had absconded. Furthermore, the applicant, who had deliberately chosen to remain on the run after escaping from prison, had received effective assistance during the proceedings from several lawyers specially appointed by him. Hence, the Italian and subsequently the French authorities had been entitled to conclude that the applicant had unequivocally waived his right to appear and be tried in person. The French authorities had therefore taken due account of all the circumstances of the case and of the Court’s case-law in granting the extradition request made by the Italian authorities: manifestly ill-founded.

Arrest and asylum in Brazil 
Battisti fled to Brazil and was arrested in Rio de Janeiro on 18 March 2007.

After Brazil granted him refugee status through a decision of its Minister of Justice Tarso Genro. Battisti's request for asylum was first denied by the National Committee for Refugees, in a decision taken by simple majority. His defense appealed to the Minister of Justice, who granted in January 2009 refugee status, a decision which divided Brazilian public opinion. Refugee status, however, halts the request for extradition, which is being considered by the Brazilian Supreme Court.

Italian President Giorgio Napolitano wrote to Brazilian President Luiz Inácio Lula da Silva, informing him of the "emotion and understandable reactions" raised in his country, in public opinion and among political forces by this "grave decision". Italian Justice Minister, Angelino Alfano, has asked Brazilian authorities to reconsider this decision "in the light of international cooperation against terrorism". Lula answered Napolitano, mentioning that Genro's decision is founded on the Brazilian constitution and on the UN 1951 Convention on Refugee Status and is an act of sovereignty of Brazil.

Criticism was also based on speculations about the influence exerted by Carla Bruni, spouse of the French President Nicolas Sarkozy, on Genro's decision. Brazilian Senator Eduardo Suplicy attested to Corriere della Sera that Bruni herself asked Lula to refuge Battisti. Bruni denied this claim on a RAI interview as she expressed her condolences with the families of Battisti's victims.

Controversy surrounded Genro's decision to grant refugee status to Battisti. Many law specialists have said that the decision was illegal. The Brazilian Supreme Court began trying the case in September 2009. By 5 to 4 (simple majority), the court ruled Genro's decision null and void on 18 November. However, the court also decided by 5 to 4 that the Brazilian constitution gives the president personal powers to deny the extradition if he chose, effectively putting the decision in the hands of Brazilian President Luiz Inácio Lula da Silva.

On 29 December 2010, unofficial reports in Italy and Brazil said President Lula was about to announce he was denying extradition of Battisti, just three days short before the end of his presidential term. The official announcement did take place on 31 December, hours before the end of Lula's time in office.

On 8 June 2011, the Brazilian Supreme Court ruled that Lula's decision is final. Italian authorities announced their intention to appeal to the International Court of Justice saying Brazil breached an extradition treaty.

In November 2013, the Universidade Federal de Santa Catarina invited Battisti to speak at a conference.

Cesare Battisti lived in the town of Embu das Artes, in the São Paulo metropolitan area, and worked as a realtor.

In March 2015, a federal judge ruled null and void a decision to grant him a permanent visa as this would conflict with Brazilian law, and ordered his deportation. The judge stressed that the deportation should not be confused with extradition, as it does not require that Battisti be surrendered to Italy, but rather to the country from which he entered Brazil, or any other country that will agree to receive him.

In June 2015 Battisti married Joice Lima, a Brazilian citizen.

On 14 September 2015, the Regional Federal Court of São Paulo declared the expulsion illegal and canceled the order of deportation.

Extradition to Italy
On 12 January 2019, Battisti was arrested by an Italian team of Interpol in Santa Cruz de La Sierra, Bolivia, and returned to Italy to start serving his sentence. On 25 March 2019, Battisti acknowledged his responsibilities in the crimes attributed to him, pleading guilty. He was imprisoned in the Costantino Satta Correctional Facility, a maximum security prison of Ferrara; however, in 2022 he was transferred to a regular penitentiary in Parma. The transferring was strongly criticized by the centre-right coalition (particularly the League and Brothers of Italy) and by the families of Battisti's victims.

Public opinion
Until 25 March 2019, Cesare Battisti denied having committed any of the murders he had been sentenced for; on that date he admitted to the chief prosecutor of Milan (Francesco Greco) involvement in four killings. The circumstances of his sentence have been questioned. A movement claiming Battisti's innocence is active in the media and in public opinion (especially in France and Italy). Among the most vocal supporters of Battisti are the writers Fred Vargas, Valerio Evangelisti and Bernard-Henri Lévy. They consider that the trials conducted in Italy were marked by irregularities. These alleged irregularities involved the use of torture (Battisti's French lawyers have not used this peculiar charge, the violation of article 3 ECHR, in their rejected claim to ECtHR), and the misuse of witnesses: according to Battisti's supporters, witnesses against Battisti were either affected by mental troubles, or were "collaboratori di giustizia", (that is, defendants testifying against other defendants in order to benefit from a reduced sentence. Those peculiar witnesses are also used by French justice, i.e. art. 132-78 French Code pénal). Battisti's supporters also claim that ballistic analysis and graphological expertises used in Italian court cases do in fact exonerate Battisti, contrary to what the courts considered.

Most of public opinion in Italy disagrees with those views, and Battisti's arrest in Brazil has been commented upon favourably in the media. Rifondazione Comunista, however, claims that he should not be extradited, as he would not be granted the right to a new trial. In France, supporters of Battisti, such as Gilles Perrault, have called the 2007 arrest, a few weeks before the April 2007 presidential election, an "electoral feat," closely timed by the then Interior Minister Nicolas Sarkozy, candidate for the UMP conservative party. François Bayrou, candidate for the UDF right-of-center party, has called for a new trial, as have members of the left-wing.

Defenders of Battisti, among whom the Human Rights League (LDH), consider that France's decision to extradite Battisti was illegal, since Battisti would not have the right to a new trial after having been judged in absentia. The right to a new trial is not a sufficient guarantee for the defendant, as clearly ruled by the ECHR in the case of Krombach v. France, application no. 29731/96; and also article 6 of ECHR, the juridical ground of Battisti's claim against extradition, doesn't prescribe a new trial. ECHR establishes that there is not an absolute right to a new trial after a trial in absentia. Battisti's claim concerned the defendant's knowledge of the trial, and Battisti's lawyers argued that the defendant had not been in a position to know that in Italy there was a trial against him, and therefore his rights had been violated.

The Union syndicale des magistrats (USM, the largest trade union of French judges) has supported the fairness of the Italian trial in absentia and has also confirmed the legality of Battisti’s condemnation:

References

Bibliography 
 Travestito da uomo (French title: Les habits d'ombre)
 Nouvel an, nouvelle vie (1994)
 L'ombre rouge (Italian title: L'orma rossa; 1995)
 Buena onda (1996)
 Copier coller (1997)
 J'aurai ta Pau (1997)
 L'ultimo sparo (French title: Dernières cartouches; 1998)
 Naples (1999, short story anthology with works also by Jean-Jacques Busino, Carlo Lucarelli, Jean-Bernard Pouy and Tito Topin)
 Jamais plus sans fusil (2000)
 Terres brûlées (2000, editor)
 Avenida Revolución (2001)
 Le Cargo sentimental (2003)
 Vittoria (2003)
 L'eau du diamant (2006)
 Ma cavale (2006)

External links 

 Audio interview of Battisti, by Isabelle Sommier, 11 February 2004, France Inter on Daniel Mermet's show 
 The website of the "Associazione Italiana Vittime del Terrorismo e dell'Eversione Contro l'Ordinamento Costituzionale dello Stato" (Association of terror victims) 
 Battisti in Brazil 
 Page on Battisti's case (Ext 1085) on the Supreme Federal Court of Brazil website

1954 births
Living people
20th-century Italian criminals
People from Cisterna di Latina
Italian expatriates in Brazil
Urban guerrilla warfare
Fugitives wanted on terrorism charges
Italian communists
Anti-revisionists
Autonomism
Italian assassins
Terrorism in Italy
20th-century Italian novelists
20th-century male writers
21st-century Italian novelists
France–Italy relations
Brazil–Italy relations
People convicted in absentia
Italian people convicted of murder
Italian people imprisoned abroad
Prisoners and detainees of Brazil
Italian prisoners sentenced to life imprisonment
Prisoners sentenced to life imprisonment by Italy
Communist terrorism
People extradited from Brazil
Italian exiles